

240001–240100 

|-id=021
| 240021 Radzo ||  || Jozef Radzo (born 1949) is a teacher of mathematics and physics at Gymnázium A. Bernoláka secondary school in Senec, Slovakia, where he established modern physics and chemistry laboratories. From 1973–1993, he worked in Gymnázium Šamor{í}n, where he encouraged S. Kürti's interest in astronomy. || 
|-id=022
| 240022 Demitra ||  || Pavol Demitra (1974–2011), Slovak ice-hockey player || 
|}

240101–240200 

|-bgcolor=#f2f2f2
| colspan=4 align=center | 
|}

240201–240300 

|-bgcolor=#f2f2f2
| colspan=4 align=center | 
|}

240301–240400 

|-id=364
| 240364 Kozmutza ||  || Flóra Kozmutza (1905–1995) was a Hungarian educator, psychologist and high school teacher. || 
|-id=381
| 240381 Emilchyne ||  || Yemilchyne Raion (translit. Emil'chyns'kyi), a district in northern Ukraine, birthplace of Baikonur engineer Vladimir Khilchenko (born 1931) and folk singer Nina Matviyenko (born 1947) || 
|}

240401–240500 

|-bgcolor=#f2f2f2
| colspan=4 align=center | 
|}

240501–240600 

|-bgcolor=#f2f2f2
| colspan=4 align=center | 
|}

240601–240700 

|-id=697
| 240697 Gemenc || 2005 GC || Gemenc, a forest and the only remaining tidal area of the Danube in Hungary. || 
|}

240701–240800 

|-id=757
| 240757 Farkasberci ||  || Bertalan "Berci" Farkas (born 1949), the first Hungarian cosmonaut and the first Esperantist in space. || 
|}

240801–240900 

|-id=871
| 240871 MOSS || 2006 DA || The Morocco Oukaimeden Sky Survey (MOSS) is an international amateur sky survey established in 2011. The Swiss–French–Moroccan partnership uses a 0.5-meter remote telescope at the Oukaïmeden Observatory , located in the Moroccan High Atlas mountain range (Src, Src, Src). || 
|}

240901–241000 

|-bgcolor=#f2f2f2
| colspan=4 align=center | 
|}

References 

240001-241000